The Treasurer of the United States is an officer in the United States Department of the Treasury who serves as custodian and trustee of the federal government's collateral assets and the supervisor of the department's currency and coinage production functions. The current treasurer is Marilynn Malerba, who is the first Native American to hold the office.

Responsibilities
By law, the treasurer is the depositary officer of the United States with regard to deposits of gold, special drawing rights, and financial gifts to the Library of Congress. The treasurer also directly oversees the Bureau of Engraving and Printing (BEP) and the United States Mint, which respectively print and mint U.S. currency and coinage. In connection to the influence of federal monetary policy on currency and coinage production, the treasurer liaises on a regular basis with the Federal Reserve. However, the duty perhaps most widely associated with the treasurer of the United States is affixing a facsimile signature to all Federal Reserve notes. Federal law requires both the treasurer's signature and the treasury secretary's countersignature for Federal Reserve notes to be considered legal tender. Moreover, the Treasurer serves as a senior advisor and representative of the Treasury Department on behalf of the secretary in the areas of community development and public engagement.

History

Creation
On July 29, 1775, long before the Department of the Treasury ever existed, the Second Continental Congress established the Treasury Office to manage revolutionary wartime finances. Congress chose George Clymer and Michael Hillegas as joint treasurers of the United Colonies. On August 6, 1776, however, Clymer resigned from his post, thus making Hillegas the sole incumbent. The position received its current name on May 14, 1777, while Hillegas was still in office.

Change in functions over the years
The post of U.S. treasurer predates the United States Constitution. The treasurer was originally charged with the receipt and custody of all government funds independent of the treasury secretary, not unlike today's elected state treasurers. Beginning in 1939 however, the Office of the Treasurer and its cash management activities were brought under the direction of a broader Fiscal Service, one that also coordinated governmentwide accounting and debt management. Later in 1974, the cash management function in its entirety was transferred from the treasurer to what is now known as the Bureau of the Fiscal Service as a cost-saving measure. Responsibility for oversight of the Bureau of Engraving and Printing (BEP) and the United States Mint was later assigned to the treasurer in 1981. In 1994, the treasurer was also named National Honorary Director of the U.S. Savings Bonds Campaign and therefore assigned the task of promoting - as opposed to managing - the program.

More recently, the requirement of the United States Senate confirmation for the appointment was dropped in August 2012.

Since the resignation of Elizabeth Rudel Smith in 1962, the length of time the office has been vacant totals more than 4,700 days, nearly thirteen years, while in the 180+ years prior to that, such time totaled less than a year.

Female officeholders
Georgia Neese Clark Gray became treasurer on June 21, 1949, making her the first woman to hold the office. Since then, every subsequent treasurer has been a woman, and several of those women have also been Hispanic, starting with Romana Acosta Bañuelos in 1971.

List of treasurers

See also
 Register of the Treasury

References

External links
 
 

 
United States Department of the Treasury
1777 establishments in the United States